The Weisshorn Hut is a mountain hut of the Swiss Alpine Club, located above Randa in the canton of Valais. It is located on the southern slopes of the Weisshorn, at a height of 2,932 metres above sea level, near the bottom of the Schali Glacier.

A trail climbing to the Schali Glacier (3,100 m) connects the Weisshorn Hut to Randa. The hut is mainly used for the ascent of the Weisshorn via the eastern ridge.

References
Swisstopo topographic maps

External links
Official website

Mountain huts in Switzerland
Buildings and structures in Valais
Mountain huts in the Alps